Ivide Ingane is a 1984 Indian Malayalam film, directed by Joshiy. The film stars Ratheesh, Sukumaran, Seema and T. G. Ravi in the lead roles. The film has musical score by Shyam.

Cast
Ratheesh as Jayan
Sukumaran as Market Raju
Seema as Ammini
T. G. Ravi as Chandrasekharan
Kunjandi as Velayudhan Pilla
Prathapachandran as Matthew
Chithra as Rema
Jagathy Sreekumar as Kuttappan
Sumithra as Elsy/Sumi
V. D. Rajappan as Maniyan
Bheeman Raghu as Sugunan
Sukumari as Bharathiyamma
Philomina as Raju's mother
Kunchan as Appukuttan
Master Rajakumaran Thampi
Baby Sonia
Rema Devi
Vettoor Purushan

Soundtrack
The music was composed by Shyam and the lyrics were written by Poovachal Khader.

References

External links
 

1984 films
1980s Malayalam-language films
Films directed by Joshiy